Character blogs are a type of blog written as though a fictional character, rather than an actual person, is making the blog post.  There are many character blogs on the Internet, and in the late 2000s (decade), it became popular among TV show producers as a means of promoting their show.  Sometimes these character blogs are done as a simple means of expression by fans or regular people unaffiliated with any professional media.  In the current decade they have become an outlet for fans of TV show, movie, and comic book characters, to play with and interact with characters ranging from those in Star Wars and Star Trek to Superman, Spider-Man and even solo characters created by the blogger themselves and placed in one of the many fictional universes found in fiction.

Types 
Official character blogs - Movies, TV shows and sometimes even brands (such as Captain Morgan) will publish an official blog for their characters.  These are often produced with marketing and tie-ins in mind, and so are planned to best convey the message wanted by the producers.

Unofficial character blogs - Sometimes fans of a known fictional character will create a blog as parody or homage to the work from which the character derives.  Star Wars has brought about several of these, the most famous example being Master Yoda's Blog.  Unofficial character blogs often are inspired by comic books, TV shows and movies.

Fantasy character blogs - Some blog writers choose to create their own original character to blog as.  Often they will be some kind of superhero type character, rather than just an ordinary person.  An element of fantasy often exists, putting the character into one or many fantasy universes, even mixing them with established fictional universes from comic books, movies and television.  This is common among role-players, particularly within the Star Wars community, where they can create their own Jedi (or Sith) character and blog as them.

Criticism
While seemingly harmless and considered a bit of fun by most, some find Character Blogging objectionable. MicroPersuasion.com's
Steve Rubel argues that "[c]haracter blogs are a waste of time because a character is not and never will be human - unless it's Pinocchio." Rubel's attack was on the official character blog for Captain Morgan, a corporate blog. Most character blogs are not set up by corporations or companies, but by fans and writers looking for a creative outlet.

Blog games
Character blogs make it possible for blog games to be played on team blogs. These are often in parody of reality TV shows. For instance, Last Gladiator Standing is a blog game that gets its name from Last Comic Standing and Amazing Mutant Race puts an X-Men twist on The Amazing Race. However, there are blog games that incorporate entire unique universes, that are created not by an official source but by the writers themselves.

Character blogging language 
In what most character bloggers refer to as the roleplaying world, there are dozens of terms that relate to not only the characters but the world that they exist in. Some of these are borrowed from tabletop roleplaying games, others are borrowed from what most call "fandoms". There are entire blogs dedicated to the understanding of these terms and acronyms.

References

External links
 Heroes United
 

Blogs
Blogging
Social information processing